Pseudodusa is an extinct genus of prawn, containing only the species Pseudodusa frattigianii, known from the Solnhofen limestones of southern Germany.

References

Penaeidae
Jurassic crustaceans
Solnhofen fauna